Gynochthodes jasminoides is a woody climber or a scrambling shrub in the family Rubiaceae. In Australia it is found on the northern and eastern coasts, in Western Australia, the Northern Territory, Queensland, Victoria, and New South Wales.

Taxonomy
Gynochthodes jasminoides was first described by Allan Cunningham in 1834 as Morinda jasminoides. In 2011, based on new molecular studies, the genera Morinda
and Gynochthodes were redescribed, which necessitated new combinations and names in these genera. This resulted in  Morinda jasminoides being assigned to the genus Gynochthodes by Sylvain Razafimandimbison and Birgitta Bremer.

References

External links

Flora NT Northern Territory Flora online: Gynochthodes jasminoides.
VicFlora Flora of Victoria: Gynochthodes jasminoides.

jasminoides
Flora of New South Wales
Flora of the Northern Territory
Flora of Victoria (Australia)
Flora of Queensland
Flora of Western Australia
Plants described in 1834
Taxa named by Birgitta Bremer